French Leave is a 1948 American comedy film directed by Frank McDonald and starring Jackie Cooper, Jackie Coogan and Renee Godfrey. It is the sequel to the 1947 film Kilroy Was Here and is sometimes known by the alternative title of Kilroy on Deck.

The film's sets were designed by the art director Dave Milton, one of the resident set designers at Monogram Pictures.

Plot

Cast
 Jackie Cooper as Skitch Kilroy 
 Jackie Coogan as Pappy Reagan 
 Renee Godfrey as Mimi 
 Ralph Sanford as Skipper Muldoon 
 Robin Raymond as Simone 
 Curt Bois as Marcel 
 Larry J. Blake as Schultyz 
 Charles La Torre as Fourcher 
 William Dambrosi as Pierre 
 John Bleifer as Pop LaFarge 
 Claire Du Brey as Mom LaFarge 
 George Lloyd as Captain Baker 
 Frank J. Scannell as Francois 
 Jimmy Cross as Riley 
 Dick Winslow as Concertina Player 
 Billy Snyder as Paul 
 Manuel París as Gendarme 
 Robert Coogan as Mack 
 Vivian Mason as Lil
 Alphonse Martell as Waiter 
 Pedro Regas as Seaman 
 Jack Tornek as Barfly

References

Bibliography
 Michael L. Stephens. Art Directors in Cinema: A Worldwide Biographical Dictionary. McFarland, 2008.

External links
 

1948 films
1948 comedy films
1940s English-language films
American comedy films
Monogram Pictures films
Films directed by Frank McDonald
Seafaring films
Films set in Marseille
American black-and-white films
1940s American films